Rajawali Station (RJW) is a class III railway station located on North Gunung Sahari, Sawah Besar, Central Jakarta. This station has four tracks and only serves the KRL Commuterline.

Building and layout 
This island platform station has four rail lines without railroad switch. The four lanes are a confluence of a pair of double lanes from the northwest (Kampung Bandan–Jakarta Kota/Angke) and northeast (Tanjung Priok). From there, all routes move south towards Jatinegara. The path to Kemayoran Station is a double track. The rail line to Tanjung Priok is now clean from any illegal settlements, unlike in previous years. Although the route to Tanjung Priok is facilitated by the overhead line cable, this line does not serve KRL Commuterline trains and only serves Container Train trips to and from Tanjung Priuk Station or Pasoso Station.

Services
The following is a list of train services at the Rajawali Station.

Passenger services 
 KAI Commuter
  Cikarang Loop Line (Full Racket)

Supporting transportation

References

External links

Central Jakarta
Railway stations in Jakarta